Manish Narwal (born 17 October 2001) is an Indian Para Pistol Shooter. He ranks fourth in the world in Men's 10m Air Pistol SH1 according to the World Shooting Para Sport Rankings. Manish is also supported by GoSports Foundation through the Para Champions Programme.

Career
He began shooting in 2016 in Ballabhgarh. Narwal pistol shooting in 2016 at Faridabad in the Haryana State, was where he made history by setting a world record while clinching gold in the P4 mixed 50m pistol SH1 event at the 2021 Para Shooting World Cup. He won several medals, including gold, silver and bronze medals in the national and International events.

Award
In 2020, Manish took The Arjuna Award, officially known as the Arjuna Awards for Outstanding Performance in Shooting sports. The Arjuna Award was the highest sporting honour of Republic of India. It is awarded annually by the Ministry of Youth Affairs and Sports.

2020 Summer Paralympics 
Manish Narwal qualified for the Paralympics Games in Tokyo and represented Team India at the Shooting Paralympic of the 2020 Summer Paralympics. He won a gold medal for India in Mixed P4 – 50 m pistol SH1.

Honours
 2021 – Khel Ratna Award, highest sporting honour of India.

See also
Paralympic Committee of India
 India at the Paralympics

References

Living people
Place of birth missing (living people)
Indian male sport shooters
Paralympic shooters of India
Shooters at the 2020 Summer Paralympics
2001 births
Paralympic gold medalists for India
Medalists at the 2020 Summer Paralympics
Paralympic medalists in shooting
Recipients of the Khel Ratna Award
Recipients of the Arjuna Award
21st-century Indian people